USS LSM-338 was a  in the United States Navy during World War II. The ship was transferred to Thailand and renamed HTMS Phai (LSM-2).

Construction and career 
LSM-338 was laid down on 14 August 1944 at Pullman Co., Chicago, Illinois. Launched on 5 December 1944 and commissioned on 10 January 1945.

During World War II, LSM-338 was assigned to the Asiatic-Pacific theater. She took part in the occupation service in the Far East from 20 September 1945 to 20 July 1946.

LSM-338 was decommissioned on 28 July 1946 and later transferred to Thailand on 14 October, later that year.

She was struck from the Navy Register.

The ship was commissioned into the Royal Thai Navy on 10 November 1947 and renamed HTMS Phai (LSM-2). She was used as spare parts for her sister ship, HTMS Kut.

The ship was then sold for scrap and her conning tower is on display at the Royal Thai Naval Training Base.

Awards 
LST-338 have earned the following awards:

American Campaign Medal
Asiatic-Pacific Campaign Medal 
Navy Occupation Service Medal (with Asia clasp)
World War II Victory Medal

Citations

Sources 
 
 
 
 

World War II amphibious warfare vessels of the United States
Ships built in Chicago
1944 ships
LSM-1-class landing ships medium
Ships transferred from the United States Navy to the Royal Thai Navy